Zlagna may refer to several places in Romania:

 Zlagna, a village in Turnu Ruieni Commune, Caraș-Severin County
 Zlagna, a village in Bârghiș Commune, Sibiu County
 Zlagna (Hârtibaciu), a river in Sibiu County
 Zlagna, a tributary of the Timiș in Caraș-Severin County